The Coed Affiliates Pershing Rifles (CAPER) was established in 1966 as the first officially recognized female auxiliary to the National Society of Pershing Rifles.  It was disbanded in the early 1980s when women were fully integrated into Pershing Rifles.  The organization has also been called the Coed Affiliates of Pershing Rifles and CAPERS over the years.

Mission 

Like Pershing Rifles, the Coed Affiliates Pershing Rifles was focused on drill and ceremony and CAPER teams competed in local and national drill meets.

History 

Over the years various women's auxiliaries to Pershing Rifles were formed at the local level. One of the earliest coed group know to be associated with Pershing Rifles was the Cadence Countesses established at the University of Nebraska in 1959.

In 1963 women at the University of Oklahoma asked to start a female drill group affiliated with Pershing Rifles Company H-7.   This led to the formation of the Kaydettes drill team.   By the fall of 1965, the Kaydettes members thought that there should be a national level organization for coed groups affiliated with Pershing Rifles.  They petitioned the National Headquarters of Pershing Rifles in Lincoln, Nebraska and were given permission to establish such an organization.  They then contacted existing coed groups across the country to start the foundation for a nationwide organization.

On January 1, 1966 the Kaydettes were established as the national female auxiliary for Pershing Rifles under the supervision of the Seventh Regimental Headquarters.  However the Kaydettes name was not acceptable because it would cause already established coed groups to change the unique names of their local units.  So on November 26, 1966, at the Pershing Rifles Fall Little National Convention the organization's name was changed to the Coed Affiliates Pershing Rifles (CAPER) and came under the direct supervision of Pershing Rifles National Headquarters.

The first CAPER National Convention was held in Washington DC in the spring of 1967 in conjunction with the Pershing Rifles National Convention and Drill Meet.  Five CAPER Companies were present, as well as observers from universities considering charting with CAPER.  By the end of the 1967 school year seven companies had been chartered with CAPER.  By 1968 the number of chartered companies had doubled to 14.

In 1969, several CAPER Regiments were established and they aligned with existing Pershing Rifles Regiments which provided some oversight.  Establishment of CAPER Regiments allowed for more concentration on unit expansion and better support to local CAPER Companies.  That same year, Colonel Iris Rodriguez was promoted to CAPER Brigadier General to elevate her to a rank above that of the regimental commanders.

On February 5, 1972 CAPER Headquarters moved to the Kansas State University. At this time the National Staff consisted of 17 officers which had oversight for 4 Regiments and 35 Companies.  At the 1973 National Convention CAPER held a separate drill meet for the first time.

Around 1976 CAPER National Headquarters moved to Auburn University, In 1978 it moved to Appalachian State University and in 1979 when it again moved to Seton Hall University.

The U.S. Armed Forces move towards fully integrating women signaled the beginning of the end of the CAPER organization.  By the mid 1970s, female students were able to take Reserve Officers Training Corps (ROTC) classes at their universities and soon were able to join Pershing Rifles.  Around that same time Pershing Rifles units started allowing non-ROTC cadets to join.  Eventually Pershing Rifles Companies integrated CAPER members into their organization.   Although the exact date is unknown the CAPER was disbanded in the early 1980s.

Some CAPER Companies chose not to join Pershing Rifles and established a new national organization called Pershing Angels that still exists today.

Units 

CAPER units were predominantly on the East coast and in the South. Many CAPER companies shared the same numbering as their affiliated Pershing Rifles Company.

Known Coed Affiliates Pershing Rifles (CAPER) units and other female auxiliaries to Pershing Rifles:

CAPER 1st Regiment

University of Kentucky (Lexington, KY) "Kentucky Babes" and "Les Sabres" affiliated with Pershing Rifles Company C-1
Ohio University (Athens, OH) CAPER Company F-1  
West Virginia State University (Institute, WV) CAPER Company H-1 "Kaydettes"
Marshall University (Huntington, WV) CAPER Company N-1 and CAPER 1st Regimental Headquarters 
Central State College (Wilberforce, OH) CAPER Company T-1

Units affiliated with 2nd Regiment Pershing Rifles

University of Nebraska - Lincoln (Lincoln, NE)  "Cadence Countesses" affiliated with Pershing Rifles Company A-2
University of Minnesota (Minneapolis, MN) CAPER Company E-2
St. John's University (Collegeville, MN)  "Petticoat Platoon" at St. Benedict College affiliated with Pershing Rifles Company H-2
Lincoln University (Jefferson City, MO)  Pershing Angels Company A-7-5 affiliated with Pershing Rifles Company M-7
South Dakota State College now University (Brookings, SD) "Pershingettes" affiliated with Pershing Rifles Company K-2

Units affiliated with 3rd Regiment Pershing Rifles

Indiana University (Bloomington) CAPER Company A-3 "Crimson Cadettes"

CAPER 4th Regiment

Tennessee Tech (Polytechnic Institute) (Crossville, TN) CAPER Company B-4
Clemson University (Clemson, SC) CAPER Company C-4 and CAPER 4th Regimental Headquarters
Wake Forest University (Winston-Salem, NC) CAPER Company D-4
Auburn University (Auburn, GA) CAPER Company G-4 and CAPER National Headquarters (1976–77)
South Carolina State University (Orangeburg, SC) CAPER Company K-4 / Pershing Angels Company K-4  
North Carolina State University (Raleigh, NC) CAPER Company L-4
Appalachian State University (Boone, NC) CAPER Company M-4 and CAPER National Headquarters (1978)        
North Carolina A & T University (Greensboro, NC) CAPER Company N-4 / Pershing Angels Company N-4
Virginia State University (Petersburg, VA) Pershing Angels Company O-4
Tuskegee University (Tuskegee Inst, AL) CAPER Company P-4 / Pershing Angels Company P-4-5
Norfolk State University (Norfolk, VA) CAPER Company C-15 / Pershing Angels Company R-4-5
Hampton University (Hampton, VA) CAPER Company D-15 / Pershing Angels Company U-4-5
Vanderbilt University (Nashville, TN) Coed group at University of South Alabama, "Kaydettes" affiliated with Pershing Rifles Company V-4

CAPER 5th Regiment

Pennsylvania State University - Altoona Campus  CAPER Company A-5 
Pennsylvania State University - University Park Campus  CAPER Company B-5 and CAPER 5th Regimental Headquarters
University of Pittsburgh (Pittsburgh, PA) CAPER Company K-5

Units affiliated with 6th Regiment Pershing Rifles

Louisiana State University (Baton Rouge, LA) CAPER Company D-6
Loyola University (New Orleans, LA) CAPER Company I-6

Units affiliated with 7th Regiment Pershing Rifles

University of Kansas (Lawrence, KS) E-Co "Berets"	affiliated with Pershing Rifles Company E-7
Kansas State University (Manhattan, KS) CAPER Company G-7 and CAPER National Headquarters (1972–76)
University of Oklahoma (Norman, OK) "Kaydettes", CAPERS Headquarters Company H-7 and CAPER National Headquarters (1966–72)
Lincoln University (Jefferson City, MO) PA com A-7-5 affiliated with Pershing Rifles Company M-7

Units affiliated with 8th Regiment Pershing Rifles

Howard University (Washington, DC) Pershing Angels Company G-8-5
Morgan State University (Baltimore, MD) CAPER Company H-15 / Pershing Angels Company J-8-5
Seton Hall University (South Orange, NJ) CAPER Company K-8, CAPER National Headquarters (1979-?)		
St. Peters College (Jersey City, NJ) CAPER Company N-8  / Pershing Angels National Headquarters
Hofstra University (Hempstead, NY) CAPER Company Q-8

CAPER 9th Regiment

University of Colorado (Boulder, CO) CAPER Company B-9 and CAPER 6th Regimental Headquarters

Units affiliated with 10th Regiment Pershing Rifles

New Mexico State University (Las Cruces, NM) CAPER Company C-10

Units affiliated with 12th Regiment Pershing Rifles

University of Connecticut (Storrs, Conn) CAPER Company F-12

Units affiliated with 16th Regiment Pershing Rifles

Alcorn State University (Lorman, Mississippi) CAPER Company B-16 
Florida A & M University (Tallahassee) CAPER Company C-16 / Pershing Angels Company C-16
Florida State University (Tallahassee) CAPER Company M-16
Fort Valley State University (Fort Valley) Pershing Angels Company A-16

Units affiliated with 17th Regiment Pershing Rifles

Hardin-Simmons University (Abilene, TX) CAPER Company L-17
Prairie View A&M University (Prairie View, TX) CAPER Company Q-17
Trinity University (San Antonio, TX) CAPER Company R-17

Commanders 

1966 – COL Gloria Robinson / COL Tanya (McDonald) Miller
1967 – COL Patricia Gail (Todd) Kish / COL Kathryn "Kay" Sykes
1968 – COL Nina Rose Jacoby / COL Gwen Coley
1969 – BG Iris Rodriguez
1970 – BG Linda Grissette
1971 – BG Paulette (Kikugawa) Lum
1972 - BG Gwen (Howell) Kelly /BG Susan Linholm
1973 – BG Rhonda (McGuire) McCommons 
1974 – BG Elizabeth Cramer
1975-77 - Unknown
1978 – BG Susan B. Rice
1979 – BG Cheryl Beers-Cullan
1980 - BG Sharon Sanders
1981 – BG Shirley Jones
1985- BG Fran Lopes
1986- BG Irene Rodriguez

External links 
  CAPER National Alumni Association

Military education and training in the United States
1966 establishments in Oklahoma
Honor societies
Pershing Rifles
Student organizations established in 1966